San Sossio Baronia is a town and comune in the province of Avellino, Campania, Italy.  Its name refers to Saint Sossius, a Roman Catholic martyr.

Located in the Apennines between the Ufita Valley and Daunian Mountains, the town is part of the Roman Catholic Diocese of Ariano Irpino-Lacedonia. Its territory borders the municipalities of Anzano di Puglia (FG), Flumeri, Monteleone di Puglia (FG), San Nicola Baronia, Trevico, Vallesaccarda and Zungoli.

References

Cities and towns in Campania